Yasir Ali may refer to:
Yasir Ali (Pakistani cricketer) (born 1985), Pakistani cricketer
Yasir Ali (Bangladeshi cricketer) (born 1996), Bangladeshi cricketer
Yasir Ali Butt, squash player
Yasser Ali, Egyptian spokesperson
Yaser Ali Al-Gabr, Yemeni footballer